Alempijević is a Serbian surname. Notable people with the surname include:

Aleksandar Alempijević (born 1988), Serbian footballer
Predrag Alempijević (born 1970), Serbian footballer

Serbian surnames